Kerb, kerbs or K.E.R.B. may refer to:
 Curb, or kerb, the raised edge of a road
 Auto racing kerbs, kerbstones lining the corners of racing tracks
 Kerb (archaeology), a type of stone ring
 KERB (AM), a radio station
 KERB-FM, a defunct radio station (106.3 FM) formerly licensed to serve Kermit, Texas, United States

See also
 Curb (disambiguation)